Combermere/Bonnie Brae Airfield  is a registered aerodrome located  west northwest of Combermere, Ontario, Canada. The aerodrome is closed between 16 November and 14 April.

References

Registered aerodromes in Ontario
Transport in Renfrew County